Bernard Augustine DeVoto (January 11, 1897 – November 13, 1955) was an American historian, conservationist, essayist, columnist, teacher, editor, and reviewer. He was the author of a series of Pulitzer-Prize-winning popular histories of the American West and for many years wrote The Easy Chair, an influential column in Harper's Magazine. DeVoto also wrote several well-regarded novels and during the 1950s served as a speech-writer for Adlai Stevenson. His friend and biographer, Wallace Stegner described Devoto as "flawed, brilliant, provocative, outrageous, ... often wrong, often spectacularly right, always stimulating, sometimes infuriating, and never, never dull."

Background 

He was born on January 11, 1897, in Ogden, Utah. DeVoto's father was a Catholic of Italian descent, an educated, impoverished man; his mother was the daughter of a Mormon farmer; and the son was accepted by neither community. He attended the University of Utah for one year, then transferred to Harvard University, entering as a member of the class of 1918. He interrupted his education to serve in the Army in World War I, then returned to school and graduated in 1920.

Career
DeVoto began his career in 1922 as an English instructor at Northwestern University. He also began publishing articles and novels (under the pseudonyms "John August" and "Cady Hewes"). In 1927 he resigned from Northwestern. He and his wife Avis moved to Massachusetts in order to attempt to earn his living from writing along with part-time instructing at Harvard University. (His ambition of attaining a permanent position at Harvard was never realized.) A series of articles he published in Harper's Magazine is credited with bringing the influential work of Italian economist Vilfredo Pareto to wide audiences.  This led to a regular Harper's column, "The Easy Chair," which DeVoto wrote from 1935 until his death.

DeVoto was also an authority on Mark Twain and served as a curator and editor for Twain's papers; this work culminated in several publications, including the best-selling Letters From the Earth, which appeared only in 1962. From 1936 to 1938 he worked in New York City, where he was editor of the Saturday Review of Literature, after which he returned to Massachusetts.

It was during his tenure as editor of the Saturday Review that DeVoto produced one of his most controversial pieces,  "Genius is Not Enough," a scathing review of Thomas Wolfe's The Story of a Novel, in which the novelist recounted his method of writing his autobiographical Of Time and the River, as essentially submitting undigested first drafts to be transformed into finished work by others. According to DeVoto, Wolfe's writing was "hacked and shaped and compressed into something resembling a novel by [his editor] Mr. Perkins and the assembly-line at Scribners." Although in passing acknowledging Wolfe's genius, DeVoto excoriated his lack of artistry, "Mr. Wolfe ... has written some of the finest fiction in our day. But a great part of what he writes is not fiction at all: it is only material with which he has struggled but which has defeated him." "Until Mr. Wolfe develops more craftsmanship, he will not be the important novelist he is now widely accepted as being." DeVoto's essay was a decisive factor in Wolfe's subsequent cutting ties with Scribners and editor Maxwell Perkins shortly before his death in 1938 and had a devastating effect on Wolfe's posthumous literary reputation.

The decade between 1943 and 53 saw the completion of what John L. Thomas called Devoto's "magnificent trilogy of the discovery, settling, and exploitation of the West":<ref>John L. Thomas, A Country of the Mind: Wallace Stegner, Bernard DeVoto, History, and the American Land(Routledge: 2013), p. 6.</ref> The Year of Decision: 1846 (1943); Across the Wide Missouri (1947); The Course of Empire (1952). Across the Wide Missouri was the recipient of the Pulitzer Prize for History (1948) and The Course of Empire received National Book Award for Nonfiction (1953). He also edited a selection of The Journals of Lewis and Clark (1953). A book on the history, geography, and ecology of the American West remained unfinished at his death in 1955; in 2001, an edited version was published as Western Paradox.

Accusations of Communism
As early as 1938, when the Dies Committee was investigating radical professors and a Soviet takeover of America, DeVoto "mocked the conspiracy nuts" and yet was called "fascist" by the Left.  In the 1950s, he felt "a Communist or two on any faculty constituted a far smaller danger than the procedures that would be necessary to keep them off."  He also opposed the outlawing of the Communist Party USA.

"Historian Bernard DeVoto spoke for many liberals"
in disdaining "the prominence ex-communists had gained in public life during the Cold War." 
He argued that despite the new-found patriotism of conservative ex-Communists, their commitments to absolutism and authoritarianism remained the same and continued to threaten freedom.

In April 1953, DeVoto's "Easy Chair" column criticized "The Case of the Censorious Congressman" during SISS and HUAC hearings of teachers.  US Representative Carroll D. Kearns called DeVoto "pro-Communist."

Personal life and death
DeVoto married Avis DeVoto (1904–1989), a book reviewer, editor, and avid cook. She became friends with Julia Child. Child had written a fan letter to Bernard DeVoto regarding an article of his in Harper's Magazine; he had said that he detested stainless steel knives, and she thought he was "100% right". Avis' response began a long correspondence and friendship between the two women during Child's work on her groundbreaking Mastering the Art of French Cooking (1961). Child acknowledged Avis as "wet nurse" and "mentor" to the undertaking.  The DeVotos' son Mark (b. 1940) is a music theorist, composer, and retired professor at Tufts University. Their older son, Gordon, a writer, died in 2009.

DeVoto died on November 13, 1955. 

Works

 The Crooked Mile (1924) novel
 The Chariot of Fire (1926) novel
  (1928) novel
 Mark Twain's America (1932)
 We Accept With Pleasure (1934) novel
 Genius is not Enough (1936) criticism
 Forays and Rebuttals (1936) essays
 Troubled Star, by John August (1939) novel
 Rain Before Seven, by John August (1940) novel
 Mark Twain in Eruption (1940), editor
 Minority Report (1940) essays
 Mark Twain at Work (1942), editor
 Advance Agent, by John August (1942) novel
  (1942)
 The Literary Fallacy (1944), criticism
 The Portable Mark Twain (1946, editor)
 Across the Wide Missouri, With an Account of the Discovery of the Miller Collection (1947) [Pulitzer Prize winner] 
 Mountain Time (1946) novel
 The Hour: A Cocktail Manifesto  (1951)
 The World of Fiction (1950)
 The Course of Empire (1952) [National Book Award]
 The Journals of Lewis and Clark (1953, editor)
 The Easy Chair (1955) essays
 Women and Children First by Cady Hewes (1956) essays
 The Letters of Bernard DeVoto (1975, edited by Wallace Stegner)
 The Western Paradox (2001, edited by Douglas Brinkley and Patricia Nelson Limerick)
 DeVoto's West: History, Conservation, and the Public Good (2002, edited by Edward K. Muller)
 The Selected Letters of Bernard DeVoto and Katharine Sterne (2012, edited by Mark DeVoto)

See also
 Avis DeVoto

References

Sources
 Stegner, Wallace E., The Uneasy Chair: A Biography of Bernard DeVoto (1974)
 Stegner, Wallace E., ed., The Letters of Bernard DeVoto (1975)
 Topping, Gary. Utah Historians and the Reconstruction of Western History (Norman, OK: University of Oklahoma Press, 2003), 
 Saveur Magazine'', #134, December 2010, p. 41.

External links

  (with linked entries as John August and Cady Hewes)
 
 The Year of Decision 1846 (online in full)
 
 "FBI was out to get freethinking DeVoto", from High Country News
 Bernard DeVoto
 ‘The Hour,’ Famous Cocktail Guide, Is Reissued William Grimes for the New York Times June 8, 2010
 

American book editors
1897 births
1955 deaths
National Book Award winners
Pulitzer Prize for History winners
Bancroft Prize winners
Historians of the American West
Historians of the United States
United States Army personnel of World War I
American writers of Italian descent
University of Utah alumni
Harvard University alumni
Northwestern University faculty
Writers from Ogden, Utah
20th-century American male writers
20th-century American essayists
20th-century American historians
American male non-fiction writers
Members of the American Academy of Arts and Letters